The 1993 Tampa Bay Buccaneers season was the franchise's 18th season in the National Football League (NFL). The Buccaneers wore the initial Mr. C on the right side of the sleeve ends of the jerseys in honor of their owner Hugh Culverhouse who was battling cancer who then died after the 1993 season.

1993 was mostly seen as a rebuilding year for coach Sam Wyche who moved on without Vinny Testaverde and went with young quarterback Craig Erickson, another University of Miami alumnus who won a national championship as their quarterback. He had a solid 3,054 passing yards. The Buccaneers lost five of their first six games on the way to a 5-11 season.

The 1993 Buccaneers have the distinction of being the only team in NFL history to have played eleven games against teams that would go on to make the playoffs; the Buccaneers were 3–8 in these games.

In his first season with the team, Hardy Nickerson set a Buccaneer record with 214 tackles.

Offseason

NFL Draft

Prior to the season they drafted John Lynch who would become one of the most popular players of all time in Tampa.

Daron Alcorn was the last player selected in the draft, commonly referred to as "Mr. Irrelevant".

Personnel

Staff

Roster

Regular season

Schedule

Notes:
Division opponents in bold text

 = blacked out locally

Standings

References

Tampa Bay Buccaneers season
Tampa Bay Buccaneers
20th century in Tampa, Florida
Tampa Bay Buccaneers seasons